St. Joseph's Community College was founded in 2005 by the Society of Jesus and shares a campus with St. Joseph's Indian High School in Bangalore, India. Its focus is on employability and entrepreneurship skills for those who are not pursuing a university education.

History 
Fathers of the Paris Foreign Missions Society opened a school for European boys on Museum Road in 1904 after a few decades opened a school for the native Indian Catholics. They established an Indian boys boarding school at St. Joseph's College of Commerce on Brigade Road. In 1972 this St. Joseph's Indian High School moved to its present campus.

In 2010 the Community College courses were all certified by Indira Gandhi National Open University, and since 2013 further diploma courses were certified by the University Grants Commission. In 2021, the college launched a 6-month certificate and 1-year diploma course in journalism in collaboration with Bengaluru-based NGO, Lead Trust.

See also
 List of Jesuit sites

References  

Colleges in Bangalore
Educational institutions established in 2005
Jesuit universities and colleges in India
2005 establishments in Karnataka